Seven Compositions (Trio) 1989 is a live album by American composer and saxophonist Anthony Braxton recorded in France in 1989 and released on the hatART label.

Reception

AllMusic awarded the album 4 stars and the review by Scott Yanow stated "As usual Braxton's improvising is quite advanced and original but is colorful and fiery enough to always hold on to open-eared listener's attention. This is one of literally dozens of stimulating Anthony Braxton sessions currently available". On All About Jazz Troy Collins noted "Seven Compositions (Trio) 1989 is a telling document of Braxton's versatility as an innovative composer and congenial collaborator".

Track listing
All compositions by Anthony Braxton except where noted.

 "Composition 40D / Composition 40G (+63)" – 19:36
 "All The Things You Are / The Angular Apron / Composition 6A" (Jerome Kern, Oscar Hammerstein II / Tony Oxley / Anthony Braxton) – 26:36
 "Composition 40J / Composition 110A (+108B+69J)" – 12:06

Personnel
Anthony Braxton – flute, sopranino saxophone, soprano saxophone, alto saxophone, C melody saxophone, clarinet
Adelhard Roidinger – bass 
Tony Oxley – drums

References

Hathut Records live albums
Anthony Braxton live albums
1990 live albums